Agnéby-Tiassa Region is one of the 31 regions of Ivory Coast. Since its establishment in 2011, it has been one of three regions in Lagunes District. The seat of the region is Agboville and the region's population in the 2021 census was 865,951.

Agnéby-Tiassa is currently divided into four departments: Agboville, Sikensi, Taabo, and Tiassalé.

Notes

 
Regions of Lagunes District
States and territories established in 2011
2011 establishments in Ivory Coast